Setopagis is a genus of nightjars in the family Caprimulgidae.

It contains the following species:
 Todd's nightjar (Setopagis heterura)
 Little nightjar (Setopagis parvula)
 Roraiman nightjar  (Setopagis whitelyi)
 Cayenne nightjar  (Setopagis maculosa)

 
Bird genera

Taxa named by Robert Ridgway